David Emanuel may refer to:

David Emanuel (fashion designer) (born 1952), Welsh fashion designer
David Emanuel (Governor of Georgia) (1744–1808)

See also
David Emmanuel (disambiguation)